José Nicolas Mafio Plada (born September 29, 1978) is a Uruguayan former swimmer, who specialized in sprint freestyle events. Mafio qualified for the men's 50 m freestyle at the 2004 Summer Olympics in Athens, by clearing a FINA B-standard entry time of 23.52 from the Argentina Long Course Nationals in Mar del Plata. Mafio touched out Jamaica's Jevon Atkinson to hit the wall first in the fourth heat by three hundredths of a second (0.03) in 23.58. Mafio failed to advance into the semifinals, as he placed fiftieth out of 86 swimmers in the prelims.

After his Olympic appearance, Mafio remained active in the swimming community, training Chilean Paralympian Vicente Almonacid.

References

1978 births
Living people
Uruguayan male freestyle swimmers
Olympic swimmers of Uruguay
Swimmers at the 2004 Summer Olympics
South American Games bronze medalists for Uruguay
South American Games medalists in swimming
Competitors at the 2006 South American Games
20th-century Uruguayan people
21st-century Uruguayan people